Sink Creek is a stream in Nodaway County in the U.S. state of Missouri. It is a tributary of Nodaway River.

A variant name was "Sinking Creek". The creek was so named because it is a losing stream along part of its course.

See also
List of rivers of Missouri

References

Rivers of Nodaway County, Missouri
Rivers of Missouri